The Tlawng is a river of Mizoram, northeastern India. Its tributaries include the Tut, Teirei and the Ngashih. The city of Aizawl is situated to the east of the Tlawng river.

In 2012, a dam (Tlawng Dam) was proposed for the river.

History
In 1890, when the British came to Mizoram, Tlawng river was the main means of transportation from Silchar. Sairang on the river banks of Tlawng is the nearest town from Aizawl which is about 14 kilometers. The journey of about 140 Kilometers from Sairang to Silchar used to take about 15–30 days depending upon the season and water level on a flat water boat.

Geography
After the confluence with Tut and Teirei River it eventually enters Cachar District. It is navigable by small boat up to Sairang.

References

Rivers of Mizoram
Rivers of India